Robert Mark Isaac (born July 27, 1954) is an American academic who uses experimental economics to address basic microeconomic problems.  His work has provided new empirical insights for many traditional economic problems, particularly cooperation and collective action problems.

Biography
He was born in Oklahoma City. His publications include collaborations with Nobel Prize winner Vernon L. Smith addressing experimental conditions for trading, with Charles Plott addressing cooperation, pricing and trade, with Robert E. Forsythe addressing auctions, and with the philosopher David Schmidtz addressing public goods.  He serves as John & Hallie Quinn Eminent Scholar in the Department of Economics at Florida State University, where he is a key faculty member affiliated with the Florida State University Experimental Social Science Lab and is also a Courtesy Professor of Law.  He is the editor of the Research in Experimental Economics book series, on the board of editors of the journal Experimental Economics, treasurer of the Economic Science Association, and holds the title of El Jefe of the Christian Men's Nicotine Research Collective.  Previously, he served as Chair of the Economics Department at the University of Arizona.

Publications

Books

The Allocation of Scarce Resources: Experimental Economics and the Problem of Allocating Airport Slots, co-authored with David Grether and Charles Plott. (Boulder, Co.: Westview Press, 1989).
Current editor of Research in Experimental Economics for JAI Press, Inc.: Volume 4 (1991), Volume 5 (1993), Volume 6 (1996), Volumes 7 (1999), Volume 8 (2001), and Volume 9 (2002).

Notes and references

External links
 Florida State University faculty profile
 Mark Isaac's profile at IDEAS
 Florida State University profile on Mark Isaac's research

Living people
1974 births
Florida State University faculty
University of Arizona faculty
Economists from Arizona
21st-century American economists